Codicote is a large village, and civil parish about  south of Hitchin in Hertfordshire, England. It has timber-framed and chequered brick houses, of special interest being the 18th-century Pond House and the half-timbered Taverners Place (formerly used as a Peking restaurant called "As You Like It", which was redeveloped in 2016 previously the George and Dragon Inn). Codicote Lodge is 18th-century and Codicote Bury 17th-century. The church, mostly rebuilt in 1853, retains 13th-century work in its nave and aisles. A most unusual structure north of the village is the Node Dairy and Stud, erected in 1927. It is circular in design, and thatched, with a circular courtyard and a tower which is, in fact, a silo.

Governance

North Hertfordshire District Council
Codicote is in the local government district of North Hertfordshire. Codicote Ward is a single member ward represented by Cllr Ian Moody (Conservative).

Hertfordshire County Council
Codicote is in the Hertfordshire County Council division of Knebworth and Codicote and is represented by Cllr Richard Thake (Conservative).

Parliamentary Representation
The village is represented in parliament by Stephen McPartland (Conservative) who was first elected as the MP for Stevenage in 2010.

Landscape

Codicote lies on a chalk ridge on the dip slope of the Chiltern Hills.

A major survey of the landscape in the parish was started in 2007.

Early history 

The first Anglo-Saxon settlements in England were created by the invaders themselves. Later individuals or small groups tended to leave these villages to found other secondary settlements in between. The element '-cote' in the name Codicote is typical of this second phase and so it is likely that this village was founded in the later period of colonisation. Thus at some time, perhaps around 600 AD, a man with a name something like Cudda came to the area and founded a settlement. The earliest form of the name is recorded in 1002 as Cuthingcoton, meaning the "cottages of Cuthhere's people". A later alternative form of the name was Cudingacotu in which the first element is "Cuda" a diminutive of Cuthhere.

In the year 1002 Codicote enters the written records for the first time when King Æthelred the Unready, its owner, sold it by means of a charter for the sum of 150 mancusae, or 900 shillings of pure gold to his 'faithful minster' Ælfhelm. It was described as being 'five measures of ground' (of uncertain extent) and known as 'Æt Cuthingcoton'. Shortly after this it passed to the Abbot and Chapter of St Albans Abbey.

By 1086, the Domesday Book shows its value at six pounds. There was a total of eight 'hides' in the manor, perhaps , of which the Abbot's bailiff farmed three and a quarter hides as the Abbot's 'home farm'. The rest was shared between a number of tenants, 16 'villeins', three humbler cottagers and one 'Frenchman' who may have been the bailiff. In addition there were four (landless) serfs. This suggests a total population of about 100 persons including women and children. There were two profitable mills (now known as Codicote Mill and Fulling Mill), some meadow and pasture and some woodland.

St Giles Church 

The church, with its chapel of the Holy Innocents, was dedicated by Ralph, Bishop of Rochester at some time during his period of office, 1108–1115.

Education 
Codicote Church of England Primary School dates back to 1857 and the current school, on Meadow Way, was built in 1972.

State secondary education is provided by schools in nearby towns and the vast majority of pupils move on to Hitchin Boys' School, Hitchin Girls' School and Monk's Walk School. Private and other schools are also well catered for in nearby towns. Herts Direct "Moving On"  Outturn Report on the Initial Analysis of Secondary School Allocations report published in 2009 reveals that 86% of Codicote Primary School pupils selecting schools for the 2009–10 academic year were allocated their first choice secondary school.

Public houses 
Public houses in Codicote include The Goat and The Globe both situated on the High Street. There is also the Sports and Social Club off Bury Lane.

Sport and leisure 
One of the most significant developments in the village of Codicote in recent decades is the ongoing development of enhanced sports facilities. The current sports field and facilities came about as a result of the death in 1976 of John Clements, a local teacher who died rescuing 35 children by leading them from a burning hotel. He was subsequently awarded the George Cross. A memorial trust fund was established in his honour which led to the current sports field and a changing facility being opened in 1984 and an extension to changing facilities being added in 2000.

There are currently three main outdoor sports areas and activities in the village:

Two football pitches used by two senior teams in Herts Premier League, 1 under 18, 1 under 17, 2 under 11, 1 under 7 team and 2 Ladies teams
Three tennis courts
A cricket wicket used by up to four cricket teams

Full planning permission was granted on 30 April 2009 for the £1.7m Sports Hall. The structure measures 48.1 meters by 19.3 meters and includes a sports hall, function room, youth club and changing facilities. The new John Clements Sports & Community Centre was completed in 2011. This allows indoor sports such as 5-a-side football, indoor tennis, cricket nets, bowls, basketball and netball.

Non-League football club Codicote F.C. are one of the senior teams using the John Clements Memorial Ground.

Codicote Tennis Club has three floodlit hard courts and is based at Codicote Sports & Social Centre in Hertfordshire.

Codicote Village Day is an annual one-day festival which begins with a parade up the High St and proceeds to the Sports and Recreation field where there are events, stalls and attractions. Village Day in 2021 will be held on Saturday 18 September.

Famous Residents 
Robert Newman British comedian, author and political activist. Former comedy partner of David Baddiel. Grew up in Hertfordshire villages of Datchworth, Codicote and Whitwell.
Kim Wilde British pop singer, author, television presenter. Married in the village church of St. Giles in September 1996.

Local and family history 
Codicote Local History Society is dedicated to researching and spreading knowledge about Codicote's history. Active for over 30 years, the society ran a wide-ranging series of public events and a few archaeological digs in 2018–19. In 2020 the society published a series of old photos of the village under the title 'Snippets from Codicote's Past'.

A 2008 BBC programme Christina: A Medieval Life, presented by Michael Wood, focused upon the life and times of Christina Cok (died 1348) in Codicote, studying the archives relating to her father's acquisition of field strips and marketplace property, which she took over in the 14th century. She won a consistory court case over her claim to the rights to her land.

References 

 
Villages in Hertfordshire
Civil parishes in Hertfordshire
North Hertfordshire District